Ludwig or Ludovicus van Beethoven the Elder, born Lodewijk van Beethoven; (?) January 5, 1712 – December 24, 1773) was a Flemish professional singer and music director, best known as the grandfather of the composer Ludwig van Beethoven.

Family
The family name means "from (van) Bettenhoven".

A number of authors, such as Alexander Wheelock Thayer and Donald W. MacArdle in his book The Family van Beethoven, point to the fact that in 1712 two boys named Ludwig van Beethoven were born. The two families were distantly related. 
 Ludwig van Beethoven, born January 5, 1712, in Mechelen, son of Michael van Beethoven
 Ludwig van Beethoven, born December 23, 1712, in Antwerp, son of Henry Adelard van Beethoven
He further writes that it is not certain "which Ludwig" actually settled in Bonn in 1733. The first biographer of the composer Beethoven "made no attempt to trace his genealogy beyond his grandfather Ludwig".

The Ludwig van Beethoven from Mechelen, generally assumed to be Beethoven's grandfather, was the second son of master baker Michael van Beethoven (baptized February 15, 1684 in Mechelen, died June 28, 1749, in Bonn) and his wife Maria Louise Stuyckers (April 24, 1685, Mechelen – December 8, 1749, Bonn). Michael van Beethoven, besides the bakery trade, participated also in the local real estate market and in the purchase and sale of antique furniture and paintings.

Michael van Beethoven had three other children:
 Kornelius van Beethoven (baptized September 25, 1708, Mechelen, died July 16, 1764, Bonn)
 Ludwig van Beethoven (baptized June 23, 1710 in Mechelen, died September 22, 1710, Mechelen)
 Lambert Michael van Beethoven (baptized July 25, 1715, Mechelen, died September 21, 1715, Mechelen)

Life
At the age of just six years Ludwig van Beethoven the Elder, having "a beautiful voice" was granted admission to the choir boys' seminar of the St. Rombout's Cathedral in Mechelen, effectively becoming a choirboy on December 10, 1717.

On October 12, 1725, he began studies under Anton Colfs, chief organist and carillonneur of St. Rumbold's Cathedral. Instruction focused on tablature and figured bass as well as the harpsichord and organ. No records exist of the years following the end of his apprenticeship in spring of 1727.

On November 9, 1731, Ludwig van Beethoven the Elder became a tenor singer at St. Peter's Church in Leuven; he is also mentioned as a substitute for the Kapellmeister. This appointment was probably promoted by Rombout van Kiel, a canon of the St. Peter's Church and former classmate of father Michael van Beethoven.

By September 2, 1732, Ludwig van Beethoven is registered as a bass singer at Saint Lambert's Cathedral, Liège. This new appointment might be attributed to the support of Francois Stoupy, director of the Liège College in Leuven and friend of Rombout van Kiel.

In March 1733 Archbishop of Cologne and  Prince-elector Clemens August of Bavaria summoned Ludwig van Beethoven the Elder to his court in Bonn after he had heard him sing in Liege, where Beethoven had been a substitute conductor. "Once Ludwig van Beethoven senior was established there, his destitute parents also fled to Bonn".

On November 17, 1733, Ludwig van Beethoven the Elder married Maria Josepha Poll (born Ball) (born about 1714, died September 30, 1775, Bonn). The marriage produced three children:
 Maria Ludovica Bernhardine van Beethoven (baptized August 28, 1734, Bonn, died October 17, 1735, Bonn)
 Mark Joseph van Beethoven (baptized April 25, 1736, Bonn, died unknown)
 Johann van Beethoven (born November 14, 1740, probably in Bonn, died December 18, 1792, Bonn); father of the composer Ludwig van Beethoven

Initially the family resided in the former Jesuit college in Wenzelgasse, then in an estate, owned by master baker Fischer in Rheingasse 386 and finally in a coaching inn in Bonngasse 386, opposite the Beethoven-Haus, (Bonngasse 515).

Ludwig van Beethoven the Elder's long-cherished hopes of one day becoming Kapellmeister went unfulfilled in 1760 when a much younger colleague, Joseph Touchemoulin, got the assignment instead. Unlike the singer Ludwig van Beethoven the Elder, Touchemoulin was an experienced violinist and an accomplished composer.

Following the death of Archbishop Clemens August of Bavaria on February 6, 1761, his successor Maximilian Friedrich von Königsegg-Rothenfels immediately implemented strict austerity measures. Ludwig van Beethoven the Elder was made new Kapellmeister with the duties of singer and conductor combined. The disillusioned Touchemoulin consequently left Bonn to find work in Regensburg. As a separate occupation Ludwig van Beethoven the Elder maintained a wine trade business, which he had developed over the course of many years, exporting Rhine and Moselle wine to Flanders. Nothing is known about the volume, success and profitability of these undertakings.

Probably not unconnected with this, his wife was to become an alcoholic, which resulted in her being placed in a clinic until her death in 1775, and his son Johann was ultimately to descend into alcoholism as well.

Ludwig van Beethoven the Elder died from a stroke on December 24, 1773, in Bonn. Although he bequeathed debts to his son Johann, the father's inheritance of commodities bestowed on the son added up to a surplus.

Reception 
Master baker Fischer described the appearance of Ludwig van Beethoven the Elder, of whom Amelius Radoux (1704 – c. 1773) had produced a contemporary oil portrait, as follows: "Stature of the court's Kapellmeister: A big beautiful man, learned man's face, broad forehead, round nose, large eyes, full red cheeks, very serious face". According to physician Franz Gerhard Wegeler, who later became a childhood friend of the composer Ludwig van Beethoven, Ludwig the Elder "was a small, vigorous man with extremely lively eyes".

Fischer and Wegeler describe him as a man with a serious and honorable character, diligent in professional practice and financial management, as well as being generally helpful and sociable.

Although his famous grandchild Ludwig van Beethoven was only three years old when Ludwig van Beethoven the Elder died, the younger Beethoven apparently had clear memories of his grandfather and developed a lasting love and admiration for him. In each of the countless times he changed lodgings during his years in Vienna, Beethoven would carry the Radoux oil portrait of his grandfather in person hurrying "to award it a place of honor" in the new home.

References

Further reading 
 Ludwig van Beethoven d. Ä., in Joseph Schmidt-Görg: Beethoven – Die Geschichte seiner Familie, Beethoven House Bonn, G. Renle Verlag München Duisburg, 1964, 
 Das große Vorbild: Großvater Louis van Beethoven, in: Jan Caeyers: Beethoven – Der einsame Revolutionär, C. H. Beck-Verlag, 2013, pp. 29–39

External links
 
 Beethoven House Bonn

1712 births
1773 deaths
18th-century German people
Musicians from Mechelen
People from the Electorate of Cologne
German people of Flemish descent
Beethoven family
Musicians of the Austrian Netherlands